Pacer (also known as Rubicon-like) is a protein that in humans is encoded by the RUBCNL gene. Pacer has been shown to increase cellular autophagy through regulation of PI3KC3.

Pacer contains a Rubicon homology (RH) domain at its C-terminus, which mediates binding to small GTPase Rab7. This domain is shared with RH domain containing family members Rubicon and PLEKHM1. Whereas Pacer appears to upregulate autophagic activity, Rubicon is a negative regulator of autophagy.

References

Further reading